11 Armoured Regiment is an armoured regiment of the Indian Army.

Formation 
11 Armoured Regiment was raised on 07 May 1984 by Lieutenant Colonel HS Lamba at Kaluchak, Jammu in  Jammu and Kashmir. It has an all-India all-class composition, drawing troops from various castes and religions.

Equipment
The regiment is presently equipped with T-72 tanks.

Regimental Insignia
The Regimental insignia consists of crossed lances with pennons, overlaid with the numeral "11" inside a sprocket at the crossing of the lances, mounted by an armoured fist and a scroll at the base with the regimental motto in Devanagari script.

The motto of the regiment is जीत ही जीत (Jeet-Hi-Jeet), which translates to ‘Always Victorious’.

References

Military units and formations established in 1985
Armoured and cavalry regiments of the Indian Army from 1947